Mohamed Hechmi Hamdi, also spelled Mohamed el Hachmi El-Hamdi, Hechmi Haamdi, or Hachmi Hamdi is a Tunisian journalist, media entrepreneur and politician, who lives in London. He is founder and owner of the oppositional Al Mustakillah TV channel. After the Tunisian Revolution in 2011 he founded the "Popular Petition" party later renamed to Current of Love.

Personal life
Mohamed Hechmi Hamdi was born in Sidi Bouzid. He has studied Arabic language and literature at the Tunis University, graduating with a B.A. in 1985. He added a masters programme in Arab literature and history at the University of London, which he completed in 1990. From the same school he obtained his doctorate in the field of contemporary Islamic studies in 1996 from SOAS, University of London.

Career
After contributing articles to different newspapers and journals, including the London-based Arabic daily Asharq Al-Awsat, he founded his own weekly Al-Mustakilla ("The Independent") in 1993, the quarterly magazine "The Diplomat" in 1996, Al Mustakillah satellite TV channel in 1999, and a second TV channel, called "Democracy", in 2005.

From the early 1980s until his resignation in 1992, Hechmi Hamdi was a member of the Tunisian Islamist Ennahda Movement. Later, he was alleged, but denied, to have developed close ties to President Zine El Abidine Ben Ali and his party, RCD. In March 2011, after the Tunisian revolution, he founded the Popular Petition for Freedom, Justice and Development (Aridha Chaabia), which he promoted from his Al-Mustakilla TV channel and announced his candidature for the presidential elections.

On 4 February 2012 Hechmi Hamdi was elected secretary general of the Party of Progressive Conservatives (PPC), which is closely linked to the Popular Petition movement. In May 2013 Hechmi Hamdi relaunched his Aridha movement under the new name of Tayar al-Mahaba, or Current of Love.

References 

Living people
Alumni of the University of London
Tunisian writers
Tunisian politicians
21st-century Tunisian businesspeople
People from Sidi Bouzid
Ennahda politicians
Alumni of SOAS University of London
Tunis University alumni
Year of birth missing (living people)
Candidates for President of Tunisia